Clayton Kenty (born 22 February 1991) is a Northern Mariana Islander sprinter. He competed in the 100 metres event at the 2009 World Championships in Athletics.

References

1991 births
Living people
Northern Mariana Islands male sprinters
Place of birth missing (living people)
World Athletics Championships athletes for the Northern Mariana Islands